The narrow-headed shrew or Kahuzi swamp white-toothed shrew (Crocidura stenocephala) is a species of shrew in the family Soricidae. It is found in the Democratic Republic of the Congo and Uganda. Its natural habitat is swamps. It is threatened by habitat loss.

References

Crocidura
Animals described in 1979